The Battle of Carthage, also known as the Engagement near Carthage, took place at the beginning of the American Civil War on July 5, 1861, near Carthage, Missouri.  Franz Sigel, a colonel with military experience from Baden (now part of Germany), commanded 1,100 Federal soldiers intent on keeping Missouri within the Union.  Claiborne Fox Jackson, governor of Missouri, personally commanded and Sterling Price, a hero of Mexican–American War, led the pro-secessionist Missouri State Guard, which numbered more than four thousand soldiers alongside two thousand unarmed troops, who did not participate in the battle.

Background
Northern and Southern sympathies divided political views in Missouri before the American Civil War.  Because economy connected Saint Louis and its surrounding counties with the North, that region generally sympathized with the Northern states.  The area with few slaves also contained a large German immigrant population, most of whom opposed slavery.  Claiborne Fox Jackson, governor of Missouri, supported the South, and the sides very heavily divided the rest of the state.  Publicly, Jackson tried to stay neutral, but the Union men suspected him of secretly preparing the state militia to seize the Saint Louis Arsenal.  

After the firing on Fort Sumter in April 1861, Abraham Lincoln, president of the United States, called for troops from all of the states to defeat the Confederacy.  He asked Missouri to send four regiments.  Jackson as governor refused the request.  Instead, he called up the Missouri State Militia, possibly to seize the Saint Louis Arsenal.  If this was his intention, Nathaniel Lyon, captain in the 2nd United States Infantry, thwarted it.  

Previously stationed in Kansas Territory, Lyon developed well-known abolitionist views.  Arriving in February 1861, Lyon quickly became associated with the "Unconditional Unionist" faction in Saint Louis.  Lyon, like many Unionists of Saint Louis, feared that Governor Jackson would employ the secessionist Minutemen paramilitary organization of the city and the local Missouri Volunteer Militia to capture the Arsenal.

Beginning on April 22, 1861, on the orders of President Lincoln, Lyon mustered in four regiments of Federal Missouri Volunteers (mostly former members of Republican Wide Awake marching clubs), issuing them weapons, drawn from the Arsenal stocks. Lincoln followed with orders to remove most of the weapons of the Saint Louis Arsenal to Illinois; in secret on the night of April 24–25, 1861, soldiers carried out this transfer.

The crisis grew worse when a shipment of Confederate siege artillery arrived at the state Militia encampment, Camp Jackson, on May 8–9, 1861. Presented with proof of treasonous plotting at Camp Jackson, Lyon marched the Federal regulars and his new Missouri Volunteers to the camp to arrest the militia. Surrounding the camp, Lyon forced the surrender of the militia and marched the prisoners to and through Saint Louis, leading to the deadly and riotous Camp Jackson affair.

The action drew great protests from Missourians, and even representatives of the City of Saint Louis petitioned Lincoln for dismissal of Lyon.  Most of Unconditional Union Party, including Francis Preston Blair Jr., congressman and brother to Montgomery Blair, postmaster general under Lincoln, however, supported action of Lyon. The Blair brothers arranged for Lyon's promotion to brigadier general. Continued Unconditional Unionist concerns over the accommodation of state authorities by Gen. William S. Harney, commander of the Department of the West, led to Harney's removal on May 31, 1861.

Prelude

On June 10, 1861, Nathaniel Lyon met with Claiborne Fox Jackson, governor of Missouri, and Sterling Price, major-general of Missouri State Guard, at Planter's House Hotel of Saint Louis in a last attempt to solve conflicting claims for state and federal sovereignty.  The conference proved futile, with both parties making mutually unacceptable demands.  After four hours, Lyon abruptly ended the meeting, and Jackson and Price retreated to Jefferson City, ordering railroad bridges burned behind them.  

Lyon moved elements of his Saint Louis garrison to steam up the Missouri River to capture the state capital at Jefferson City, Missouri.  Franz Sigel, colonel, took command of a second element of Federal troops, moving from Saint Louis into southwest Missouri to cut off Missouri State Guard forces who might retreat south in the face of advance of Lyon.  On June 12, 1861, he started to move his first and second battalions alongside five infantry companies, two rifle companies, and an artillery battery towards Springfield.  

The Missouri State Guard in Jefferson City retreated to Boonville, where a pivotal skirmish took place on June 17.  Lyon quickly took the town and chased the Missouri State Guard south.  Due to logistical difficulties, Lyon could not keep up with the retreating Guardsmen.  Another group of State Guardsmen in Lexington, after learning of the defeat at Boonsville, also moved south under Sterling Price.  Troops of Sigel arrived in Springfield and quickly took the town.  They prepared to march to Carthage, expecting to catch the retreating State Guardsmen.  

Units of Jackson and Price units met in Lamar on July 3 and started to organize.  Army of Jackson grew to 6,000 men, a large number of whom joined along the march south.  Only hunting rifles, shotguns, knives, or, in some cases, no weapons at all, however, for the most part armed the force in Lamar.  On the next day, July 4, Sigel arrived at Carthage with 1,100 men.  Intelligence of Sigel indicated before July 4 that the Missouri State Guard camped near Lamar, about 18 miles north of Carthage. On the night of July 4, State Guard skirmishers collided with pickets of Sigel outside Carthage.  Both sides thus knew of presence of the other side.

Battle

Learning that Franz Sigel had encamped at Carthage, Claiborne Fox Jackson, governor of Missouri, took command and made plans to attack the smaller but better armed Union force. On the morning of July 5, Jackson marched his green soldiers south. The rival armies met 10 miles north of Carthage, and the State Guard raised two Confederate stars and bars flags on either side of their line, which stretched over half a mile.  Men of Sigel provided an impressive display as they formed a line of battle and moved within 800 yards of the State Guard troops.  

Opening the action with his artillery, Sigel closed to the attack. Jackson replied with his own artillery. Jackson and the State Guard then chased after brigade of Sigel, engaging them in battle as they pushed them 10 miles southward until they reached the outskirts of Carthage.  Jackson ordered his men to divide and to attempt to surround force of Sigel; the battle went steadily through the day until both forces faced off in the Carthage town square.  Both sides then engaged in some skirmishing.  At this time, Sigel learned of a large body of Guardsmen—actually all unarmed recruits—moving into the woods on his left outside town.  Fearing that this force would turn his flank, he ordered a retreat. The State Guard pursued, but Sigel conducted a successful rearguard action.  Sigel returned back in Carthage before evening. Under cover of darkness, he retreated further to Sarcoxie, Missouri.

Aftermath
Independent partisan rangers, serving with Joseph Orville Shelby, captain in Missouri State Guard, on the battlefield introduced new tactics; owing in large part to these tactics, the secessionist state guard won a strategic victory in this battle.  Carthage helped to spark recruitment for the Southern regiments and thus played a part in determining course of Missouri during the war.  Robert Wells Crawford, an attorney and founder of the county, fought in the battle.  Waldo Porter Johnson, formerly a United States Senator from Missouri, in a letter, dated October 24, 1862, to Claiborne Fox Jackson, governor of Missouri in exile, nominated him lieutenant colonel of the 5th Missouri Infantry Regiment (Confederate) and later the 13th Missouri Cavalry Regiment (Confederate), and he served in this office as a recruiter for the Confederate States Army in Missouri.

Significance
After Abraham Lincoln invoked "the war power" in lieu of a declaration of war in his message to Congress on July 4, 1861, the chronologically first major strategically and tactically significant battle occurred at Carthage.  The battle marks the only time when a sitting governor of a state in the United States of America personally led troops in the field, and he then led them against the Union to which his state belonged.  Joseph Orville Shelby, a captain and Missouri farmer, commanded a band of 150 independent partisan rangers, serving at the vanguard of army of Claiborne Fox Jackson, that governor.  Batteries of made 

These rangers of Shelby pressed retreat of Franz Sigel to Sarcoxie and thus "snatched the victory at Carthage" from grasp of batteries of Franz Sigel and their tactical battlefield maneuvers under fire; pro-Confederate elements in Missouri therefore celebrated their first victory. The depopulation of mineral-rich Jasper County and the destruction of Carthage by sustained hostilities throughout the war paved the way for Victorian-era resettlement.

Battlefield preservation
The American Battlefield Trust and its partners in battlefield land preservation have acquired and preserved  of the Carthage battlefield through November 2021.

Notes

References

 Monhegan, Jay. Civil War on the Western Border: 1854-1865. Boston: Little, Brown, 1956.
 O'Flaherty, Daniel. Sutherland, Daniel E. General Jo Shelby: Undefeated Rebel. Chapel Hill: University of North Carolina Press. June 1, 2000. 1954 (first edition).
 Piston, William Garrett. Wilson's Creek, the Second Battle of the Civil War and the Men Who Fought It. Chapel Hill: University of North Carolina Press, 2000.
 Rombauer, Robert J. The Union Cause in St. Louis in 1861. St. Louis: St. Louis Centennial Year (Press), 1909.
 Schrantz, Ward L. Jasper County, Missouri in the Civil War, 1923.
 National Park Service battle description

Further reading
 Burchett, Kenneth E. The Battle of Carthage, Missouri: First Trans-Mississippi Conflict of the Civil War (Jefferson, NC): McFarland, 2013. 230 pages online review
 Hinze, David C. & Karen Farnham. The Battle of Carthage: Border War in Southwest Missouri, July 5, 1861 Gretna, LA: Pelican Publishing Co., 2004. . Originally published: Campbell, CA: Savas Publishing Company, 1997. .

External links
Harper's Weekly illustrations
Battle of Carthage State Historic Site
American Civil War Story: Battle of Carthage
Found Poems: Cultural Fragments of Missouri's Antebellum Frontier

1861 in the American Civil War
1861 in Missouri
Carthage 1861
Carthage (1861)
Jasper County, Missouri
July 1861 events
Carthage 1861
Carthage 1861